Thomas Ramos (born 23 July 1995) is a French rugby union player, who plays as a full-back and fly-half for Toulouse in the Top 14.

International career
In November 2017, Ramos was selected for the French Barbarian team which played and beat the Māori All Blacks 19–15.

Ramos received his first call-up to the French squad for the 2019 Six Nations. He made his debut off the bench against England on 10 February.

International tries

Honours

Toulouse
 European Rugby Champions Cup: 2020–21
 Top 14: 2018-19, 2020-21

France
 Six Nations Championship: 2022

References

External links
France profile at FFR
Toulouse profile
L'Équipe profile

1995 births
Living people
People from Mazamet
French rugby union players
France international rugby union players
Stade Toulousain players
Rugby union fullbacks
French people of Portuguese descent
Sportspeople from Tarn (department)
US Colomiers players